Sean Cronin was an American meteorologist and political candidate in Wisconsin. His brother, Kevin Cronin, is the lead singer of R.E.O. Speedwagon.

Television career
Cronin served as a weather forecaster, producer and reporter at WIFR in Rockford, Illinois from 1981 to 1983. He then served as weather forecaster and reporter at KOLR in Springfield, Missouri from 1983 to 1984.

After becoming a certified meteorologist by the National Weather Association, Cronin began working at WLUK-TV in Green Bay, Wisconsin. In 1986, he became Chief Meteorologist at KOLO-TV in Reno, Nevada and remained there until 1988. From 1988 to 1999, Cronin was Chief Meteorologist at WAOW in Wausau, Wisconsin.

Political career
Cronin was a candidate for the United States House of Representatives from Wisconsin's 7th congressional district in 2000.  He lost to incumbent Dave Obey. Cronin was a Republican.

Sean died on Saturday, February 2, 2019.

References

Wisconsin Republicans
Candidates in the 2000 United States elections
20th-century American politicians
American television meteorologists
2019 deaths
People from Marathon County, Wisconsin